Marlon Brando's Corset is a dark comedy play by Guy Jones, which takes a sideswipe at celebrity culture and the obsession with stardom and fame. The play premiered at the 2006 Edinburgh Festival Fringe and embarked on a UK tour thereafter.

Synopsis 

The action takes place on the set of a (fictional) long-running TV series called Healing Hands, a medical drama in the vein of BBC's Casualty, and centres around the show's writer, Nick Chase, and his tussles with the show's star Will Swift and director Alex.

Cast 
The cast includes Les Dennis, Mike McShane, Jeremy Edwards and Jim Field Smith.

Production Team 
Director: Ed Curtis
Producer/General Manager: Richard Jordan
Designer: Morgan Large
Lighting Designer: James Whiteside
Sound Designer: Jem Kitchen
Produced by Ed Curtis Associates, Richard Jordan Productions and Guildford's Yvonne Arnaud Theatre in association with Greenwich Theatre London

Film

The play was to be made into a major motion picture, set for release in 2009.

External links 
Marlon Brando's Corset - the show's official website
Ed Curtis Associates
Yvonne Arnaud Theatre, Guildford
Edinburgh Fringe

English plays
2006 plays